William Aubrey Thomas (June 7, 1866September 8, 1951) was an American scientist and politician who served as a US Representative from Ohio from 1904 to 1911.

Biography 
Born in Y Bynea, near Llanelli, Carmarthenshire, Wales, Thomas immigrated to the United States in 1868 with his parents, who settled in Niles, Ohio. He attended the public schools of Niles, Mount Union College, and Rensselaer Polytechnic Institute, where he majored in metallurgical chemistry.

He was an analytical chemist in Niles from 1886 to 1888 and was engaged in the iron and steel business. He served as president of The Mahoning Valley Steel Company and as secretary and director of the Niles Firebrick Co.

Thomas was elected as a Republican to the Fifty-eighth Congress to fill the vacancy caused by the resignation of Charles W. F. Dick on this election to the Senate. He was reelected to the Fifty-ninth, Sixtieth, and Sixty-first Congresses and served from November 8, 1904, to March 3, 1911. He was an unsuccessful candidate for reelection in 1910 to the Sixty-second Congress.

He moved to Alabama in 1918 and continued his interest in the manufacture of iron, steel, and firebrick. He served as president of the Jenifer Iron Co. He died in Talladega, Alabama, on September 8, 1951, aged 85. He was interred in Oak Hill Cemetery in Youngstown, Ohio.

Thomas became a Mason in 1887, and was the youngest Master in Ohio when he led his lodge for two terms. He became a member of the Elks in 1892 and was a Presbyterian.

References

1866 births
1951 deaths
American manufacturing businesspeople
American metallurgists
People from Niles, Ohio
Rensselaer Polytechnic Institute alumni
Welsh emigrants to the United States
University of Mount Union alumni
People from Talladega, Alabama
Republican Party members of the United States House of Representatives from Ohio